Baron Konstantinos Bellios or Vellios (Blatsi, 7 March 1772 – Vienna, 23 December 1838) was a Greek merchant and benefactor from the Ottoman Empire, the modern region of  Greek Macedonia.

Life
His Aromanian (Vlach) family, hailed from Linotopolis (modern Linotopi in the Kastoria Prefecture). Like the other inhabitants of the village, they abandoned it in 1769, after it was destroyed by Turco-Albanian irregulars during the suppression of the Orlov Revolt. The inhabitants spread across Macedonia, but Bellios' family settled in Blatsi (modern Vlasti, Kozani Prefecture), where Bellios was born in 1772.

Konstantinos' father, Alexandros, left Blatsi for Constantinople. Konstantinos and his older brother Stefanos received their first education at Vlasti, but later left for Constantinople, where they continued their studies. In 1812, Konstantinos and Stefanos accompanied the newly appointed hospodar (ruler) of Wallachia, Ioannis Karatzas, to his province. The brothers settled at the Wallachian capital Iasi, where Stefanos rose to become the logothete (minister) of Justice. Konstantinos Bellios acquired a thorough education at the Greek gymnasium of Iasi, and began his career in commerce and finance. Eventually, he settled in Vienna, where, on 24 February 1817, Emperor Francis I of Austria ennobled him as Baron von Bellios.

Following the establishment of the independent Kingdom of Greece, he spent much of his fortune in donations and beneficent works "to assist and be of use to my homeland at a time when it is beginning to rise again". His benefactions include:
 Foundation of the Elpis Hospital in Athens, the first hospital established in the country after Independence
 Foundation of the Nea Pella settlement for Macedonian refugees in Atalanti who had fled south during the Greek War of Independence. Bellios gave each of the ca. 200 families a home and ca. 4 hectares of land.
 The Velieion trust, which offered scholarships to Macedonians from Vlasti, Siatista, Kastoria, and other cities of Macedonia, as well as Nea Pella
 Fund drives in Vienna and Bucharest to raise money for schools, hospitals, etc. in Greece
 Donation of the first safe to the Greek government in 1836
 Donation of his library for use by the settlement of Nea Pella to the National Library of Greece, comprising 771 titles in 1886 volumes
 Donations to the Educational Society (Φιλεκπαιδευτική Εταιρεία) in 1837
 Donation of lands to the value of 70,000 drachmas to the Municipality of Athens

In 1836 he visited Athens, the capital of independent Greece, where he was received with honours by King Otto, who decorated him with the Order of the Redeemer. In return, Bellios gave the king an 11th-century sword, and to Queen Amalia a rare edition of Homer. He stayed in Athens for three months, from December 1836 to March 1837. During his stay, he became acquainted with Kyriakos Pittakis, director of the Greek Archaeological Service. His contact with Pittakis, and his tours of the antiquities of Athens, made a deep impression on Bellios, which led to his decision to co-found and fund the private Archaeological Society of Athens in 1837.

He died in Vienna on 3 December 1838.

Legacy

Bellios was considered an inspirational figure by the Young Macedonian Literary Association. He was referred to as a "Macedonian compatriot" in the preamble in the first issue of their journal Loza in 1892.

References

Sources

1772 births
1838 deaths
19th-century Austrian people
19th-century Greek people
Barons of Austria
Greek merchants
Austrian people of Aromanian descent
Greek people of Aromanian descent
History of Greece (1832–1862)
Greek expatriates in Austria
19th-century Greek businesspeople
People from Vlasti